Éloyse Lesueur (born 15 July 1988) is a French long jumper.

Career

Lesueur became the first woman from France to win a long jump gold medal at the European Championships when she won the 2012 European Championships long jump event in Helsinki by jumping 6.81 meters in the final.

Lesueur currently holds the French national indoor record of 6.90 m. This record was set in the final of the 2013 European Indoor Championships in Gothenburg, where she won the silver medal.

Lesueur withdrew from the 2015 World Championships in Athletics because of torn ligaments in her right knee sustained during training in May 2015.

Results in international competitions
Note: Only the position and distance in the final are indicated, unless otherwise stated. (q) means the athlete did not qualify for the final, with the overall position and distance in the qualification round indicated.

References

External links
 
 
 
 

1988 births
Living people
French female long jumpers
Sportspeople from Créteil
Athletes (track and field) at the 2012 Summer Olympics
Olympic athletes of France
European Athletics Championships medalists
World Athletics Indoor Championships winners
IAAF Continental Cup winners